Krešo Tretinjak (4 July 1905 – 22 September 1987) was a Yugoslav épée and sabre fencer. He competed in the three events at the 1936 Summer Olympics.

References

External links
 

1905 births
1987 deaths
Yugoslav male épée fencers
Olympic fencers of Yugoslavia
Fencers at the 1936 Summer Olympics
Yugoslav male sabre fencers